Woodville is a town in Jackson County, Alabama, United States. It was officially established by an act of the Alabama State Legislature on December 13, 1819, one day before Alabama became a state. It was later incorporated on May 12, 1890, but lost its charter in 1897. It reincorporated in 1912. As of the 2010 census, the population of the town is 746, down from 761 in 2000.

History
Woodville was settled about 1815 by Henry Derrick and is the oldest town in Jackson County. It was named for early residents Richard and Annie Wood. Woodville became the seat of Decatur County, Alabama in December 1821, but was attached to Jackson County when Decatur County was abolished the following year. The surrounding area was the site of considerable guerrilla warfare and small actions during the American Civil War, including the Skirmish at Paint Rock Bridge.

Geography
Woodville is located at  (34.626775, -86.274832). The town is situated along State Route 35, with an older section of town lying a few blocks west of SR 35 along County Road 8, facing the railroad tracks.  U.S. Route 72, which intersects SR 35 in the southern part of Woodville, connects the town with Scottsboro to the east and Huntsville to the west.  The Cumberland Plateau rises just north of Woodville, and the Paint Rock River passes just to the west.  The Fern Cave National Wildlife Refuge lies to the northwest.

Demographics

As of the census of 2000, there were 761 people, 301 households, and 232 families residing in the town. The racial makeup of the town was 96.98% White, 1.71% Native American, 0.13% Asian, and 1.18% from two or more races. 0.92% of the population were Hispanic or Latino of any race.

There were 301 households, out of which 32.2% had children under the age of 18 living with them, 63.5% were married couples living together, 10.6% had a female householder with no husband present, and 22.9% were non-families. 22.3% of all households were made up of individuals, and 11.6% had someone living alone who was 65 years of age or older. The average household size was 2.53 and the average family size was 2.92.

In the town, the population was spread out, with 24.4% under the age of 18, 8.9% from 18 to 24, 29.0% from 25 to 44, 23.8% from 45 to 64, and 13.8% who were 65 years of age or older. The median age was 36 years. For every 100 females, there were 87.0 males. For every 100 females age 18 and over, there were 90.4 males.

The median income for a household in the town was $35,000, and the median income for a family was $37,426. Males had a median income of $27,946 versus $17,292 for females. The per capita income for the town was $15,796. About 9.7% of families and 11.5% of the population were below the poverty line, including 11.5% of those under age 18 and 20.5% of those age 65 or over.

References

External links

Towns in Jackson County, Alabama
Towns in Alabama
Huntsville-Decatur, AL Combined Statistical Area
Populated places established in 1815
Former county seats in Alabama
1815 establishments in Mississippi Territory